Bhoot and Friends is a 2010 Indian action adventure horror-comedy film directed by Karanjeet "Kittu" Saluja. The film has got "U" certificate by CBFC.

Synopsis
The film revolves around four kids who are currently on their summer holidays at their maternal grandmother's home and they meet a friendly ghost with magical powers to help them in finding a precious treasure called "Neelmani Ka Khazana".

Cast
Jackie Shroff as Bhanu Pratap Singh / Bhoot
Ashwin Mushran as Gora Sa'ab / Gora Sahab
Markand Soni as Raghav
Tejas Rahate as Ali
Ishita Panchal as Roma
Akash Nair as Igloo
Aditya Lakhia as Ali's Father
Nishikant Dixit as Sharmaji Manager
Faiz Khan as Hakla
Sushil Pandey as Banke
Ashish Kattar as Raghav's father

Production
The film is also directed by three additional directors named: Harish Kumar Patel, Brijesh Singh and Kuldeep Yadav. The stunts were added by Hanif Sheikh.

Release
Film is initially going to release on 24 December along with Toonpur Ka Superhero as Christmas bonanza, but postponed till last date of year due to clash with Tees Mar Khan. The film is released theatrically on New Year's Eve of 2011 but only on 25 prints.

Home media
The film is currently available on Disney+ Hotstar, Amazon Prime and Youtube, and is often broadcast by Cartoon Network India.

Box office
It earned ₹25,000 on first day, ₹75,000 on first weekend and a sum of ₹1,00,000 on its first week.

Critical reception
The film has received generally mixed to negative reviews by critics.

Animated series
In 2019, an animated series based on the film is produced by the same production
company, directed by Ramji Achary, and is currently provided by Amazon Prime. The series consists of 10 episodes, each of 10 minutes.

References

2010 films
Indian adventure comedy films
Indian children's comedy films
Indian ghost films
2010s Hindi-language films
Indian comedy horror films